Odamtten is a patronymic surname of Ga-Dangme origins, derived from the Ga male name, Odamete. It is borne by the La people of Accra, Ghana. Notable people with the surname include: 

 Charles Odamtten Easmon (1913 – 1994), first Ghanaian surgeon and first Dean of the University of Ghana Medical School
 George Tawia Odamtten (born 1948), Ghanaian mycologist

Ga-Adangbe families
Ga-Adangbe people
Ghanaian families
Ghanaian surnames
Patronymic surnames
Odamtten family